The 2022 Oregon State Beavers football team represented Oregon State University during the 2022 NCAA Division I FBS football season. The Beavers played their home games at Reser Stadium in Corvallis, Oregon, and competed as members of the Pac–12 Conference. They were led by head coach Jonathan Smith, in his fifth season. The team finished 10-3, becoming the third team in Oregon State history to achieve 10 wins and accomplishing the second highest win percentage since 1967.

Schedule

Roster

Rankings

Game summaries

vs Boise State

at Fresno State

vs No. 4 Montana State (FCS)

vs No. 7 USC

at No. 12 Utah

at Stanford

vs Washington State

vs Colorado

at Washington

vs California

at Arizona State

vs No. 9 Oregon

vs. Florida (Las Vegas Bowl)

References

Oregon State
Oregon State Beavers football seasons
Las Vegas Bowl champion seasons
Oregon State Beavers football